Hanife is a female name of Turkish origin. It is the Turkish form of the Arabic name Hanifa, the feminine form of Hanif, which means "bend" (to the right religion).

Given name
 Hanife Demiryol (born 1992), Turkish women's footballer

See also
 Hanifa (disambiguation)

References

Turkish feminine given names